Bishopton is a village in the borough of Darlington and the ceremonial county of County Durham, England. It is situated to the west of Stockton-on-Tees.
It originated as a farming community with rows of cottages and several farms forming a long wide village street, with an adjacent green. St Peter's Church stands at the centre of the village. The hamlet of Little Stainton and the village of Great Stainton were formerly part of the parish of Bishopton.

Castle Hill 

The earthworks of a motte-and-bailey fortification known as Castle Hill are situated 400m south of the village and west of Bishopton Beck which flows west of the village. The fortification, which is a Scheduled Ancient Monument, dates back to at least the 12th century, with a licence to crenellate having been granted in 1143 during the time of The Anarchy.

Education 
As of 2011 Bishopton Redmarshall CofE Primary School, which is situated in the north-west of the village, had 106 pupils, aged 4–11. In October 2006 Ofsted judged the school to be good and this rating was maintained in the June 2010 interim inspection. In August 2011 the school reopened as an Academy. As of September 2007 the school has been in a federation with Heighington CE Primary School.

Religious sites 

St Peter's Church, Bishopton, is an active Anglican parish church in the deanery of Stockton, the archdeaconry of Auckland, and the diocese of Durham. The church has been designated by English Heritage as a Grade II listed building.

Sport 
South of the village there is a lake which was a former gravel pit and is now used as a windsurfing centre.

Gallery

References

External links

 Bishopton Village Website
 An england.net site
 Village Hall
 History
 Village Notes

Villages in County Durham
Places in the Borough of Darlington
Places in the Tees Valley